Theodore Roosevelt Cox (born 1914), nicknamed "Benny", was an American Negro league third baseman between 1937 and 1944.

A native of Baton Rouge, Louisiana, Cox made his Negro leagues debut in 1937 with the Detroit Stars and Chicago American Giants. He played for the Kansas City Monarchs the following season, and ended his career with a three-year stint with the New York Cubans from 1942 to 1944.

References

External links
 and Seamheads

1914 births
Year of death missing
Chicago American Giants players
Detroit Stars (1937) players
Kansas City Monarchs players
New York Black Yankees players
New York Cubans players
Baseball third basemen
Baseball players from Baton Rouge, Louisiana